A beauty pageant or beauty contest is a competition that has traditionally focused on judging and ranking the physical attributes of the contestants. Pageants have now evolved to include inner beauty, with criteria covering judging of personality, intelligence, talent, character, and charitable involvement, through private interviews with judges and answers to public on-stage questions. The term beauty pageant refers originally to the Big Four international beauty pageants. Pageant titles are subdivided into Miss, Mrs or Ms, and Teen – to clearly identify the difference between pageant divisions. Similar events for men or boys are usually called by other names and are more likely to be bodybuilding contests.

Women's pageants

International

Major
List of world's Big Four international beauty pageants (the original Big Four):

 Miss World (1951–present)
 Miss Universe (1952–present)
 Miss International (1960–present)
 Miss Earth (2001–present)

Sub-major
International beauty pageants aside the Big Four (based on its consistency and popularity)
 Miss Supranational (2009–present)
 Miss Grand International (2013–present)

Minor 
List of minor beauty pageants:

Miss Intercontinental (1971–present)
Miss Globe (1974–present)
World Miss University (1986–present)
Miss Model of the World (1988–present)
Top Model of the World (1993–present)
Miss Tourism International (1994–present)
The Miss Globe (2004–present)
Miss Aura International (2006–present)
Miss United Continents (2006–present)
Miss Tourism Metropolitan International (2007–present)
Miss Supertalent (2011–present)
Face of Beauty International (2012–present)
Miss Global (2013–present)
Miss Heritage Global (2013–2016, 2019–present)
Miss Eco International (2015–present)
Miss Planet International (2016–present)
Miss Progress International (2017–present)
Miss Glam World (2018–present)
Miss Supermodel Worldwide (2019–present)
Miss Glamour Look International (2019–present)
World Tourism Queen (2020–present)
World's Unforgettable Beauty (2020–present)
Miss Ambar World (2021–present)
Miss Elite (2021–present)
Miss Glamour International (2021–present)
Miss Environment International (2022–present)
Miss Fabulous International (2022–present)
Miss Face of Humanity (2022–present)
Supermodel International (2022–present)
Miss Mutya International (2023–present)
Universal Woman (2023–present)
Miss Charm (2023–present)
Miss Multiverse

Continental and regional 
The following are continental and regional pageants:
Miss Europe (1927; 1929–1939; 1948–2006; 2016–present)
Reinado Internacional del Café (1957–present)
Miss Scandinavia (1961–1974, 1976–1981, 1986–2005, 2007–2008, 2021–present)
Miss Asia Pacific International (1965, 1968–2005, 2016–2019, 2023–present)
Miss América Latina (1981–present)
Miss Asian America (1985–present)
Miss Asia Pageant (1985–present)
Reina Mundial del Banano (1985–present)
Miss Pacific Islands (1987–present)
Miss Chinese International Pageant (1988–present)
Miss India Worldwide (1990–present)
Miss World Cup (1990–present)
Reina Hispanoamericana (1991–present)
Miss Arab World (2006–present)
Miss University Africa (2010–2012, 2017–2018; 2021–present)
World Muslimah (2011–present)
Miss Filipina International (2013–present)
Miss South East Asia Tourism Ambassadress (2015–present)
Reina Internacional de la Paz Petite (2020–present)
Reina Mundial de los Carnavales (2020–present)
Reina Internacional del Cacao (2020–present)

Teen
List of teen beauty pageants:

Miss Teen International (1966–present)
Miss Teen Intercontinental (1973–present)
Miss Teenager World (1990–present)
Miss Teen World (2001–present)
Miss Teen Earth (2012–present)
Teen Universe International (2012–present)
Miss Teen Supranational (2018–present)
Miss Eco Teen (2018–present)

Marital 
List of international marital beauty pageants:

Mrs. World (1984–present)
Mrs. International (1988–present)
Mrs. Globe (1996–present)
Mrs. Universe (2007–present)
Mrs. Tourism (2016–present)

Senior 
List of senior (women aged 40 to 90+) beauty pageants:

 Senior Pageants Group
 Señora Clásica Mesoamérica Universe (2021–present)
 Señora Mesoamérica Universe (2021–present)

Discontinued
 International Pageant of Pulchritude (1926–1935)
 International Teen Princess (1966–1974)
 Miss Maja International (1966–1989)
 Miss Wonderland (1988–1990)
 Queen of the World (1988–2011)
 Miss Global Beauty Queen (1998–2009, 2011, 2015–2017)
 Miss Asia Pacific World (2011–2014)
 Miss Crystal Angel International (2018)
 Ms. International (2010–2018)
 Miss All Nations (1989–1990, 2010–2019)
 Miss Subways (1941–1976, 2004, 2017–2019)
 Miss Globe International (1988–2021)

National

Africa

 
 Miss Algeria
 
 Miss Angola
 
 Miss Botswana
 Miss Universe Botswana
 Miss Earth Botswana
 
Miss Cameroon
 
Miss Cape Verde
 
Miss Chad

Miss Awoulaba
Miss Cote d'Ivoire
 
 Miss Congo (RDC)
 Miss Earth DR Congo
 
 Miss Earth Congo
 
 Miss Egypt
 
 Miss Ethiopia
 Miss Universe Ethiopia
 
 Miss Gabon
 
 Miss Universe Ghana
 Miss Ghana
 Miss Earth Ghana
ECOWAS Peace Pageant
Miss Malaika Ghana
Miss Grand Ghana
 
 Miss Kenya
 Miss World Kenya
 Miss Universe Kenya
 Miss Earth Kenya

Miss Liberia
Miss Earth Liberia

Miss Madagascar
 
Miss Mauritius
Miss Estrella Mauritius
Miss Earth Mauritius
 
Miss Mayotte
 
 Miss Maroc
 
 Miss Mozambique
 
 Miss Namibia
 
 Most Beautiful Girl in Nigeria
 Miss Nigeria
 Miss Earth Nigeria
 The Nigerian Queen

Miss Earth Republic of Congo

Miss Réunion
Miss Earth Reunion

Miss Rwanda

Miss Seychelles

Miss Sierra Leone
Face of Sierra Leone

Miss Senegal

Miss South Africa
Miss Earth South Africa
Miss Grand South Africa

Miss South Sudan
Miss Earth South Sudan

Miss Sudan

Miss Universe Tanzania
Miss Tanzania

Miss Togo

Miss Tunisia

Miss Uganda
Miss Earth Uganda

Miss Zambia
Miss Universe Zambia
Miss Earth Zambia

Miss Zimbabwe
Miss World Zimbabwe
Miss Earth Zimbabwe
Miss Heritage Zimbabwe

Asia

Miss Afghanistan
 
 Miss Armenia

Miss Azerbaijan

Miss Bahrain

Miss Bangladesh

Miss Bhutan

Cambodian beauty pageants
Miss Grand Cambodia

Miss Universe China
Miss China World
Miss International China
Miss Earth China

Miss Hong Kong Pageant
Miss Asia Pageant

Miss Macau

Miss Tibet
 
 Miss Cyprus
 
 Miss Georgia
 
 Femina Miss India
 Miss Diva
 Miss Divine Beauty
 Glamanand Supermodel India
 Miss Earth India
 Miss India International
 Miss India Worldwide India
 Gladrags Megamodel Contest
 Elite Model Look India
 I Am She–Miss Universe India
 Bharat Sundari
 Alee Club
 
Puteri Indonesia 
Miss Indonesia
Miss Universe Indonesia
Miss Mega Bintang Indonesia
Putri Nusantara
Putri Bumi Indonesia
Putri Pariwisata Indonesia

Iran beauty pageants

Iraqi beauty pageants

Miss Israel

Miss Nippon
Miss Japan
Miss Universe Japan
Miss World Japan
Miss International Japan
Miss Earth Japan
Miss Grand Japan

Miss Jordan

Miss Kazakhstan

Miss Kyrgyzstan

Lao beauty pageants
Miss Grand Laos

Miss Lebanon

Miss Universe Malaysia
Miss World Malaysia
Miss International Malaysia
Miss Supranational Malaysia
Miss Grand Malaysia
Ratu Wanita Malaysia

Miss Mongolia
Miss World Mongolia

Miss Universe Myanmar
Miss International Myanmar
Miss World Myanmar
Miss Earth Myanmar
Miss Supranational Myanmar
Miss Grand Myanmar

Miss Nepal
Miss Teen Nepal
Miss Universe Nepal
Miss Grand Nepal

Miss Pakistan World
 
 Binibining Pilipinas
 Miss Universe Philippines
 Miss Earth Philippines
 Miss World Philippines
 Miss Republic of the Philippines
 Mutya ng Pilipinas
 Miss Grand Philippines

Miss Universe Singapore
Miss World Singapore
Miss Singapore International
Miss Earth Singapore

Miss Korea
Miss Queen Korea
Miss Grand Korea

Miss Earth Sri Lanka
Miss Universe Sri Lanka
Miss World Sri Lanka
Miss Sri Lanka Online

Miss Chinese Taipei
 
 Miss Thailand
 Miss Teen Thailand
 Miss Thailand World
 Miss Universe Thailand
 Miss Earth Thailand
 Miss International Thailand
 Miss Grand Thailand
 Miss Supranational Thailand
 
 Miss Turkey

Miss Uzbekistan

Miss Vietnam §
Miss Universe Vietnam §
Miss World Vietnam §
Miss Grand Vietnam
Miss Supranational Vietnam
Miss Earth Vietnam
Miss Vietnam World
§ Big Three national beauty pageants

Europe

 
 Miss Universe Albania
 
 Miss Austria
 Miss Earth Austria
 
 Miss Belarus
 
 Miss Belgium
 Miss Earth Belgium
 
 Miss Bosnia & Herzegovina
 Miss Earth Bosnia & Herzegovina
 
 Miss Universe Bulgaria
 Miss World Bulgaria
 
 Miss Universe Croatia
 Miss Croatia
 
Czech Miss
Miss České republiky
Miss Czech Republic
 
 Miss Denmark
 Miss Universe Denmark
 Miss World Denmark
 Face of Denmark
 
 Miss Estonia
 
 Miss Finland
 Suomen Neito
 
 Miss France
 Miss International France
 Miss Excellence France
  Corsica
 Miss Corsica
 
 Miss Germany
 Miss Universe Germany
 Miss World Germany
 
 Miss Gibraltar
 
 Star Hellas
 Star GS Hellas
 
 Miss Hungary
 Miss Universe Hungary
 Magyarország Szépe
 
 Miss Iceland
 Miss Universe Iceland
 Miss World Iceland
 
 Miss Universe Ireland
 Miss Ireland
 
 Miss Italia
 Miss Italia nel Mondo
 Miss Universo Italia
 Miss World Italy
 Miss Earth Italy
 
 Miss Universe Kosovo
 Miss World Kosova
 Miss Kosovo
 
 Mis Latvija
 Miss Universe Latvia
 
 Miss Liechtenstein
 
 Miss Lithuania
 
 Miss Luxembourg
 
 Miss Malta
 Miss World Malta
 Miss Malta Universe
 
 Miss Monaco
 
 Miss Montenegro
 
 Miss Nederland

Miss Macedonia
 
 Miss Norway
 
 Miss Polski
 Miss Polonia
 Miss Earth Poland
 
 Miss República Portuguesa
 Miss Queen Portugal (Miss Earth Portugal)
 
 Miss Romania
 Miss Universe Romania
 
 Miss Russia
 Krasa Rossii
 
 Miss San Marino
 
 Miss Serbia
 
 Miss Slovakia
 Miss Universe Slovenskej Republiky
 
 Miss Universe Slovenia
 Miss Slovenia
 Miss Earth Slovenia
 
 Miss Spain
 Miss Earth Spain
 Miss Grand Spain
 
 Miss Sweden
 Miss Universe Sweden
 Miss World Sweden
 
 Miss Earth Schweiz
 Miss Switzerland
 Miss World Switzerland
 
 Miss Ukraine Universe
 Miss Ukraine
 Miss Ukraine Earth
 
 Miss Universe Great Britain
 Miss Great Britain
 Miss United Kingdom
 Miss Africa Great Britain
 
 Miss England
 Miss Earth England
 
 Miss Northern Ireland
 Miss Earth Northern Ireland
 
 Miss Scotland
 Miss Earth Scotland
 
 Miss Wales
 Miss Earth Wales

North America

 
 Miss Antigua & Barbuda
 
 Miss Aruba
 
 Miss Bahamas
 Miss Universe Bahamas
 
 Miss Universe Barbados
 Miss Barbados World
 
 Miss Belize
 
 Miss Bermuda
 
 Miss Bonaire
 
 Miss British Virgin Islands
 
 Miss Canada
 Miss Universe Canada
 Miss World Canada
 Miss Earth Canada
 
 Miss Cayman Islands
 
 Miss Costa Rica
 Reinas de Costa Rica
 
 Miss Cuba
 
 Miss Curaçao
 Miss International Curaçao
 Señorita Curaçao
 
 Miss Dominica
 
 Miss Dominican Republic
 
 Nuestra Belleza Mundo El Salvador
 Reinado de El Salvador
 
 Miss Greenland
 
 Miss Grenada World
 
 Miss Guadeloupe
 Miss International Guadeloupe
 
 Miss Guatemala
 
 Miss Haiti
 
 Señorita Honduras
 Miss Honduras
 
 Miss Jamaica Universe
 Miss Jamaica World
 Miss Earth Jamaica
 
 Miss Martinique
 Martinique Queens
 
 Mexicana Universal 
 Miss México
 Miss Earth México
 Rostro de México
 Señorita México
 
 Miss Nicaragua
 Miss Mundo Nicaragua
 Miss Nicaragua International
 Miss Grand Nicaragua
 Nuestra Belleza Nicaragua
 
 Señorita Panamá
 
 Miss Puerto Rico
 Miss Universe Puerto Rico
 Miss World Puerto Rico
 Miss International Puerto Rico
 Miss Earth Puerto Rico
 
 Miss St. Barthelemy
 Miss St. Martin & St. Barthélemy
 
 Miss St. Kitts & Nevis
 
 Miss St. Lucia
  (French part of Saint Martin)
 Miss St. Martin & St. Barthélemy
  (Dutch part of Saint Martin)
 Miss Sint Maarten
 
 Miss Saint Pierre and Miquelon
 
 Miss St. Vincent and the Grenadines
 
 Miss Trinidad and Tobago
 Miss Universe Trinidad and Tobago
 Miss Earth Trinidad and Tobago
 
 Miss Turks and Caicos
 
 Hawaiian Tropic Teen Miss
 Miss America
 Miss America's Outstanding Teen
 Miss Asian America
 Miss Black America
 Miss Black USA Pageant
 Miss Brasil USA
 Miss Chinatown USA
 Miss Earth United States
 Miss Grand USA
 Miss Hawaiian Tropic USA
 Miss India USA
 Miss Latina US
 Miss Rodeo America
 Miss Rodeo USA
 Miss Teen Rodeo USA
 Miss Supranational USA
 Miss U.S. International
 Miss United States
 Miss USA
 Miss Teen America
 Miss Teen US Latina
 Miss Teen USA
 Miss Teenage America
 Ms. Texas Senior America
 Miss Viet Nam Continents
 Miss World America
 Mrs. America
 National Sweetheart
 
 Miss US Virgin Islands
 Miss Virgin Islands

Oceania

 
 Miss Australia
 Miss Earth Australia
 Miss International Australia
 Miss Universe Australia
 Miss World Australia
 Miss India Australia
 Miss Latina Australia
 
 Miss Cook Islands
 
 Miss Fiji
 
 Miss Guam
 Miss World Guam
 Miss Earth Guam
 
 Miss New Caledonia
 
 Miss Universe New Zealand 
 New Zealand at Miss World
 Miss Earth New Zealand
 
 Miss Marianas
 
 Miss Samoa
 
 Miss Tahiti
 
 Miss Wallis and Futuna

South America

 
 Miss Argentina
 Belleza Argentina
 Miss Earth Argentina
 
 Miss Bolivia
 
Miss Brazil
Miss Brazil World
Miss Earth Brazil
Miss Grand Brazil
 
 Miss Universo Chile
 Miss Earth Chile
 Miss World Chile
 Miss Grand Chile
 
 Miss Colombia
 Miss Mundo Colombia
 Miss Earth Colombia
 Miss Universe Colombia
 
 Miss Ecuador
 Miss Earth Ecuador
 Miss World Ecuador
 Miss Teen Ecuador
 
 Miss French Guiana
 
 Miss Guyana
 Miss Universe Guyana
 Miss Earth Guyana
 
 Miss Paraguay
 Miss Grand Paraguay
 
 Miss Peru

 Miss Suriname
 
 Miss Uruguay
 
 Miss Venezuela
 Miss Venezuela Mundo
 Miss Earth Venezuela
 Miss Global Venezuela
 Miss Grand Venezuela
 Miss Supranational Venezuela
 Miss Turismo Venezuela

Former states

  (before 2006)
 Miss Serbia and Montenegro
  /  Yugoslavia (before 2002)
 Miss Yugoslavia
  (before 1993)
 Miss Czechoslovakia
  (before 1991)
 Miss USSR
  (before 1981)
 Miss RSA
  (before 1980)
 Miss Rhodesia
  (before 1963)
 Miss Rhodesia and Nyasaland
  (before 1938)
 Miss Siam

Men's pageants

International

Major
List of world's seven major beauty pageants (the Big Seven);
 Manhunt International (1993–2012, 2016–present)
 Mister World (1996–present)
 Mister International (2006–present)
 Mister Universe (2008–present)
 Mister Global (2014–present)
 Mister Supranational (2016–present)
 Man of the World (2017–present)

Minor
 Mister Young International (2000–present)
 Mister Model International (2013–present)
 Mister Globe (2015–present)
 Mister United Continents (2015–present)
 Mister Universal Ambassador (2015–present)
 Mister Universe International (2015–present)
 Man of the Year (2016–present)
 Mister Planet (2016–present)
 Mister Tourism World (2016–present)
 Mister Grand International (2017-present)
 Mister National Universe (2017–present)
 Mister Tourism and Culture Universe (2018–present)

Modeling

Best Male Model of the World (1995–present)
Elite Model Look Men (2014–present)
Altitude World Supermodel  (2018–present)

Continental and regional 
 Mr. Asia (2005–present)
 Mr. Mesoamérica Universe (2012–present)

Teen
List of teen beauty pageants:

Mister Teen World (2003–present)
Mister Teen Earth (2014–present)
Mister Global Teen (2015–present)

Discontinued
 Mr. Europe (1993–1998)
 Mr. Joven Internacional (1993–1999)
 Mr. Scandinavia (1997–2003)
Hombre Internacional (1998–2002)
Male International Model (1998–2005)
Mister Handsome International (1998–2019)
Mister Intercontinental (1998–2002)
Mr. International (1998–2003)
Mister Continents (1999–2003)
Mr. Tourism International (2001–2002, 2010–2015)
Mister Latino International (2002–2004)
Mister Model Millenium (2003)
Mister Teen Continents (2002–2003)
Mister Tourism Universe (2002–2005)
International Best Male Model of the World (2003)
Mister Earth (2003)
Mr. Tourism World (2003)
Axe Men World Male Model (2004)
Mr. Globe (2004)
Mister Teen Model World (2004)
Zeus of the World (2004)
Mister Continentes del Mundo (2005–2016)
Mister Expo World (2005–2020)
Mister Mundial (2005–2014)
Mister Pacific of the World (2006–2018)
World Most Beautiful Bum (2007–2008)
Mister Sea World (2008–2019)
Fresh Faces (2010–2013)
Mister Teen Jade Universe (2010–2018)
Mister Jade Universe (2010–2018)
Mister Pacífico y el Caribe (2012–2015)
Mister Universo Mundial (2012–2019)
Mister Universo Mundial (2012–2019)
Mister América Internacional (2013–2019)
Mister Mesoamérica International (2013–2019)
Mister Teen Mesoamérica Universe (2013–2017)
Mr. Joven Mesoamérica International (2014–2019)
Mister Real Universe (2014–2019)
Mister Teen América International (2014–2019)
Mister Model Universe (2015–2019)
Mister Trifinio Mundo Internacional (2017–2019)

National

Africa

 
 Mr Egypt
 
 Mr Nigeria

Asia

Mister International Azerbaijan

Mister Cambodia
 

Mr. Hong Kong
 
 Mister India World
 Gladrags Manhunt
 Rubaru Mister India
 Grasim Mr. India
 Alee Club
 
 Putera Indonesia
 Mister Indonesia
 Mister Global Indonesia
 L-Men of The Year

Mister Japan

Mister World Korea
Mister International Korea

Mister International Laos (Mister Laos)
 
 Mister Lebanon

Mister Myanmar
 
 Mister Malaysian
 
 Mister World Philippines
 Manhunt International Philippines
 Mister Philippines
 Misters of Filipinas
 
 Mister Singapore

 Mister Thailand
 Mister Supranational Thailand

 Mister Vietnam
 The Next Gentleman

Europe

 
 Mister Belgium Personality
 
 Muž Roku
 
 Mister Denmark
 
 Mister Polski
 
 Muž Roku Slovenskej Republiky
 
 Mister Spain

North America

 
 Mister Bahamas
 
 Mr. World Canada
 
 Mister Dominican Republic
 
 El Modelo Mexico
 Mr Model México
 
 Mister Nicaragua
 
 Mister Panamá
 
 Misters of Puerto Rico

South America

 
 Mister Brazil
 
 Mister Chile
 
 Mister Ecuador
 
 Mister Venezuela
 Caballero Venezuela
 Mister Deporte Venezuela
 Mister Global Venezuela
 Mister Handsome Venezuela
 Mister Petite Venezuela
 Mister Supranational Venezuela
 Mister Teen Venezuela
 Mister Turismo Venezuela
 Mister Universo Venezuela
 Mister Young Venezuela

LGBTQ+ pageants & Deaf Pageants

International

Major
Best Model of the World (1990–present)
Miss & Mister Deaf World (2001–present)
Miss International Queen (2004–present)
Mister Gay World (2009–present)
Miss & Mister Deaf International (2010–present)
Miss Trans Star International (2010–present)
Miss T World (2017–present)
Miss Trans Global (2020–present)

Minor 

 Miss Teen World International (2021–present)

Continental and regional 
Mister Gay Europe (2005–present)
Miss Wheelchair Latinoamericana (2021–present)

Discontinued 
Mr. Gay International (2005–2012)
Super Sireyna Worldwide (2014–2018)

National

Africa
 
 Mr Gay South Africa

Asia

 
 Mr. Gay India
 Miss Transqueen India
 
 Miss Trans Israel

 Miss Gay Philippines
 Mr. Gay World Philippines

 Miss Tiffany's Universe
 
 Best Model of Turkey

 Miss International Queen Vietnam

Europe

 
 Miss Trans Albania
 
 Mr Gay Ireland
 
 Mr Gay Sweden
 
 Mr Gay UK
 
 Mr Gay Wales

North America
 
 All American Goddess
 Best in Drag Show
 La Femme Magnifique International Pageant
 Miss Continental
 Miss'd America
 Miss Gay America
 Miss Gay USofA
 National Entertainer of the Year
 The World's Most Beautiful Transsexual Contest
 International Ms. Leather
 International Mr. Leather

Oceania

 
 Miss Island Queen Pageant
 
 Miss Galaxy Pageant

South America 
 
 Mister Gay Chile

See also

Lists of awards

References

Entertainment lists

Lists of awards
Man of the World (pageant)